Gaali Sampath is a 2021 Indian Telugu-language survival drama film directed by Anish R. Krishna, from a screenplay, written by Anil Ravipudi. The film stars Rajendra Prasad, Sree Vishnu, and Lovely Singh. Tanikella Bharani, and Satya play supporting roles. Prasad and Vishnu portray a father-son duo. The music is composed by Achu Rajamani. 

Upon release, on 11 March 2021, the film opened to mixed reviews and was a commercial failure at the box office.

Plot
Sampath, a Radio Jockey whose ambition is to be an actor, loses his wife and his voice in an accident that occurred on a rainy day. As he can only make blowing noises, he is nicknamed "Gaali Sampath". Years later he lives with his son Suri who's a trucker with respiratory problems. Suri falls in love with the village head's daughter. He convinces the chief by assuring him that he would only marry his daughter if he is capable of settling in life. He gets 5 Lakh rupees cash from a bank manager with a promise that he would return the money in a week and store it in a cabinet.

Sampath gets a chance to participate in a  competition, but he has to pay the guy who booked the slot to give up his chance for 5 lakh rupees. Sampath asks his friend who is in love with the chief's daughter, who tries to sabotage Suri's marriage by asking Sampath to create a ruckus so the chief would cancel their marriage. Sampath not knowing that his son loves her beats the chief and reports to his friend who betrays him.

Sampath takes the money in the cabinet with hopes to repay his son after winning the competition for prize money of 8 Lakhs. He acts as a mime unable to feed his baby due to poverty. The audience is moved by his performance. On the same day, his son feels betrayed by his father for sabotaging all his plans and leaves the house. Sampath, depressed tries to curse the rain for taking away everything perfect in his life and slips to fall into a deep well and is knocked out of consciousness. Sampath overhears his son telling him that he is better on his own and tells everyone that his father is better dead than alive. Sampath after hearing this desperately tries to kill himself.

Suri meanwhile learns the real intentions from his father's friend, upon learning what his father had to sacrifice for his well-being, he begins searching for his father. Desperate, he stops near the well where the chief asks Suri to stop searching for Sampath and marry his daughter to move on with his life. Suri refuses and speaks highly of his father, upon hearing this Sampath motivated tries to get out of the well.

As he makes progress with items he finds inside the well, he nears the brim of the well only for it to start raining and him losing his grip to fall down. Meanwhile, Suri goes into a panic attack and loses his breathing, while Sampath starts cursing the rain he finds out that the rain facilitates him to swim to the top and get out of the well. Although injured, he provides medication to Suri and passes out of exhaustion from his attempt to escape the well. After a few days, Sampath wins the first prize in the competition and uses the money to repay Suri's debt along with helping him buy a new truck. On the same day when it starts to rain instead of cursing it, he starts to dance and enjoy the rain showing his new take on life.

Cast 

 Rajendra Prasad as Gaali Sampath
 Sree Vishnu as Suri, Gaali Sampath's son
 Lovely Singh as Papa, Suri's love interest
 Tanikella Bharani as Station Master, Gaali Sampath's brother-in-law , Suri 's Uncle
 Satya as Gaali Sampath's Translator
 Raghu Babu as Veerabhadram
 Anish Kuruvilla as Bank Auditor
 Srikanth Iyyengar as Bank Manager Haribabu
 Rajitha as Haribabu's wife
 Srinivasa Reddy as Driver
 Mirchi Kiran
 Gagan Vihari
 Sreenivas Sai
 Mime Madhu
 Surendra Reddy
 Karate Kalyani as Pankajam
 Rajasree Nair as Gaali Sampath's wife
 Rupalakshmi

Production 
The film was announced in October 2020. Later, the film was launched and muhurat shot was done on 16 November 2020 at Ramanaidu Studios in Hyderabad, India. Principal photography of the film began in the same month of November. Most of the scenes were shot in Uttarandhra region of Andhra Pradesh. S. Krishna wrote the story and co-produced the film while Anil Ravipudi scripted the film and supervised the direction department.

Release 
The film was theatrically released on 11 March 2021. Later, Gaali Sampath is released digitally though Aha and Amazon Prime on 19 March 2021.

Reception 
The Indian Express critic Gabetta Ranjith Kumar stated that the characterisation and Rajendra Prasad's portrayal of Gaali Sampath are the positive aspects of the film. Y. Sunitha Chowdhary of The Hindu felt that film was not engaging enough and wrote "Loud characters become a liability in this survival drama."

A reviewer from The Hans India gave a positive review for the film, writing that "Gaali Sampath is a first of its kind attempt in Telugu cinema and has been executed perfectly." Jalapathy Gudelli in his review for Sify concluded that "Rajendra Prasad’s strong performance and Sree Vishnu’s acting are the only good parts. Lame writing and old-school narration have diluted the emotional angle of the film."

References

External links 
 

2021 films
2021 drama films
2020s Telugu-language films
Films shot in Andhra Pradesh
Films set in Andhra Pradesh
Indian drama films
Indian survival films
2020s survival films
Films scored by Achu Rajamani